Anthia (Greek: Άνθεια) is a village in the southern part of the Evros regional unit in Greece.  Anthia is located near the old Greek National Road 2 between Alexandroupoli and Feres. It is 10 km east of the centre of Alexandroupoli. Anthia was the seat of the municipality of Traianoupoli, and a municipal district within that municipality, together with the village Aristino.  In 2011 its population was 781 for the village and 1,226 for the municipal district.  The settlements was created with the migration of Arvanites from Turkey in 1923. They largely originate from the inhabitants of the villages of Qytezë and Sultanköy.

Villages

Anthia, pop. 781
Aristino, pop. 445

Population

See also

List of settlements in the Evros regional unit

External links
Anthia on GTP Travel Pages
General Information on Anthia

References

Populated places in Evros (regional unit)
Albanian communities of Western Thrace